Gilligan's Island is an enduringly popular 1960s American television comedy. 

Gilligan's Island may also refer to:

Entertainment
Gilligan's Island (film), the remake film of the TV series
Gilligan's Island (pinball), a 1991 pinball machine based on the TV show
The Adventures of Gilligan's Island, also known as Gilligan's Island: The Video Game, a 1990 video game based on the TV show
"Gilligan's Island (Stairway)", a song by Little Roger and the Goosebumps

Other uses
Gilligan's Island, an alternate name of one of the cays of the Cayos de Caña Gorda, south of Puerto Rico
Gilligan's Island, a nickname for a secondary pitlane at Sonoma Raceway